Kisse Pyaar Karoon is a 2009 Indian comedy film directed by Ajay Chandok. The film stars Arshad Warsi, Aashish Chaudhary and Yash Tonk.

The basic plot is lifted from Hollywood comedy Saving Silverman which in turn was also the main theme of 2008's comedy movie De Taali.

Plot
The movie revolves around John (Ashish Chaudhary), Sid (Arshad Warsi), and Amit (Yash Tonk), three college students nearing graduation. The three of them have been friends since childhood and now live together in Sid's dilapidated bungalow. John has been in love with his classmate Natasha (Arti Chabria) for a long time but is never able to express his love. After graduation, Amit and Sid visit Munna Bhai (Ashish Vidyarthi), a gangster who treats the two of them as his sons. Munna Bhai gives them a job as a three-man Punjabi band for hire at weddings.

John decides to visit Natasha to express his feelings but is too late as she had left for a world tour. Subsequently, John becomes extremely sad and cannot stop thinking of Natasha. At a wedding performance, John's sadness brings down the vibe of a wedding which they were performing at, resulting in the three of them getting beaten up by the wedding guests. The doctor (Shashi Kiran) treating them suggests to Sid and Amit that they should get John's mind off Natasha to bring back his happiness. Thus, they decide to hire a prostitute for John.

Consequently, Amit finds Chameli (Shweta Menon) (named after Kareena Kapoor's character in the movie of the same name), who instantly falls in love with Amit and is willing to marry him. Amit hesitantly rejects her offer and pays her money to go to John. John bores Chameli by only talking about Natasha, which meant Sid and Amit's plan to cheer up John failed. Later, while the three were at a pool, John looks at Sheetal (Udita Goswami) and is immediately attracted to her. To Sid and Amit's surprise, the two of them hit it off well.

As John and Sheetal get closer, he invites her to Sid's bungalow. Sheetal is disgusted by the unhygienic and uncivilised ways in which the three of them live. She puts forth an ultimatum to John to choose between her or his friends. He chooses Sheetal over his friends, and she starts driving Sid and Amit away from John by not letting them meet him. This concerned Sid and Amit, who felt she was extremely controlling. Thus, they started looking for ways to drive them apart. First, Sid and Amit tried to bribe Sheetal with Sid's bungalow to leave John, which she unequivocally declined. After that failed, they decided to photoshop John onto intimate pictures with Chameli (who now called herself Julie, after Neha Dhupia's character in the movie of the same name) and mail it to Sheetal. This plan also failed, as Sheetal immediately recognised the photos were morphed.

John approaches his father (Adi Irani) as he decides to marry Sheetal. His father, Albert D'Monto, is a rich businessman running a toy manufacturing company. He disowns John as he does not approve of the marriage. It is revealed that Sheetal is actually working for a weapons smuggler named AK 47 (Shakti Kapoor). He wants Sheetal to enter John's home and take control of Albert D'Monto's business, which they will use as a front to smuggle weapons. Since Albert D'Monto disapproved of the marriage, AK 47 decides to kill him. He uses Inspector Jadhav (Vindu Dara Singh) to make the murder look like it was committed by a runaway criminal. At Albert's funeral, John confronts Sid and Amit for all the things they did to drive a wedge between him and Sheetal, and warns them to stay away.

Even though John's disdain hurt Sid and Amit, they were still determined to save him from Sheetal. During this time, they encounter Natasha, who was back from her tour. They tell her all about John and Sheetal, which is when Natasha reveals she was also in love with John all this while. They decide to introduce Natasha into John's life again, so that he may leave Sheetal. Contrary to their hopes, Natasha's reappearance does not affect John much. So, Sid and Amit decide to kidnap Sheetal. They leave a car to blow up in the forest to make it look like Sheetal died, when in fact she was held hostage at Sid's place. With John thinking Sheetal died, Natasha comes forth to support him, and they start dating.

Sid and Sheetal start developing feelings for each other during the time she was held hostage at his house. It creates a rift between Sid and Amit. A dejected Amit goes to Munna Bhai and tells him about the entire kidnapping plan and how Sheetal is creating problems between him and Sid. Munna Bhai suggests that Amit have her killed. He tells Amit to contact AK 47 to do the job. When he contacts AK 47, he gets shot at since Sheetal worked for AK 47. Luckily, Sid manages to rescue Amit, and they immediately go to the police station to report the shooting. Unfortunately, Inspector Jadhav was present at the station, who locks them up for kidnapping. AK 47 rescues Sheetal and tells her to go back to John and marry him.

John is now forced to choose between Natasha and Sheetal. He also thinks Natasha was involved in Sheetal's kidnapping, which hurts Natasha. She decides to leave for America for good. John informs Sid and Amit that he will marry Sheetal. Munna Bhai and Julie ram their car through the walls of the lockup and escape with Sid and Amit.

At John's wedding, high security is placed by AK 47 and Inspector Jadhav. Sid, Munna Bhai, and Amit disguise themselves as Amar, Akbar, and Anthony respectively and enter the wedding. Their disguise is soon uncovered as AK 47's goons start attacking them. Meanwhile, John finds out Natasha is with him at the pedestal and not Sheetal. Natasha tells John about Sheetal's truth. Sheetal also comes forward and reveals to John that she worked for AK 47 only because he trapped her brother in the drugs trade so that he can use her for his ulterior motives. When she tells him that AK 47 killed his father, he joins Sid and Amit in beating up AK 47 and his goons. Soon, Julie brings the police with her and gets AK 47 and his men arrested.

In the end, John and Natasha, Sid and Sheetal, and Amit and Julie get married together at the same ceremony.

Cast
 Arshad Warsi as Siddharth "Sid" 
 Ashish Chaudhary as John D'Monto
 Yash Tonk	as Amit
 Udita Goswami as Sheetal
 Aarti Chhabria as Natasha
 Shweta Menon as Chameli / Julie
 Ashish Vidyarthi as Munna Bhai 
 Shakti Kapoor as AK 47
 Vindu Dara Singh as Inspector Jadhav 
 Adi Irani as Albert D'Monto
 Jeetu Verma	 
 Shashi Kiran		
 Arun Verma
 Brahma Bagwan		
 Praveen		
 Vrajesh Tripathi

Soundtrack
The soundtrack for Kisse Pyaar Karoon was composed by Daboo Malik and the lyrics were written by Shabbir Ahmed.

Reception
The film was a box-office disaster, according to Box Office India. Taran Adarsh of Bollywood Hungama rated the film one out of five stars, calling the writing "archaic and outdated" and concluding it as a "masala film may've struck a chord a few years ago, not today". Shashi Baliga of Hindustan Times gave the film zero stars.

References

External links
 

2009 films
2000s Hindi-language films
Films shot in Dubai
Films shot in Mumbai